Massimo Federici (born 13 August 1956) is an Italian politician. He is member of the Democratic Party. He served as mayor of La Spezia from 2007 to 2017 and as President of the Province of La Spezia from 2014 to 2017.

References 

1956 births
Living people
Democratic Party (Italy) politicians
21st-century Italian politicians
Mayors of places in Liguria
People from La Spezia
Presidents of the Province of La Spezia